The 2014–15 Minnesota Timberwolves season was the 26th season of the franchise in the National Basketball Association (NBA).
The Timberwolves finished with the worst record in the league at 16–66 and missed the NBA Playoffs for the 11th straight year. For the first time since 2007–08 season, Kevin Love was not on the roster as he was traded to the Cleveland Cavaliers in exchange for Andrew Wiggins, Anthony Bennett, and their future first round picks. Despite not making the playoffs, Andrew Wiggins won the NBA Rookie of the Year. Flip Saunders returned to the Timberwolves' head coach on his second stint. Saunders was diagnosed with Hodgkin's lymphoma in August 2015 and he died two months later on October 25, 2015 at the age of 60. He was replaced by former Timberwolves player and former NBA Coach of the Year, Sam Mitchell for the following season. Kevin Garnett returned to the team for the first time since he left Minnesota in the offseason trade to the Boston Celtics.

Preseason

Draft picks

Regular season

Standings

Game log

|- style="background:#fcc;"
| 1
| October 29
| @ Memphis
| 
| Thaddeus Young (26)
| Nikola Peković (8)
| Ricky Rubio (7)
| FedExForum17,731
| 0–1
|- style="background:#cfc;"
| 2
| October 30
| Detroit
| 
| Thaddeus Young (19)
| Nikola Peković (10)
| Ricky Rubio (8)
| Target Center18,296
| 1–1

|- style="background:#fcc;"
| 3
| November 1
| Chicago
| 
| Kevin Martin (33)
| Gorgui Dieng (8)
| Ricky Rubio (17)
| Target Center19,356
| 1–2
|- style="background:#cfc;"
| 4
| November 5
| @ Brooklyn
| 
| Kevin Martin (24)
| Thaddeus Young (12)
| Ricky Rubio (12)
| Barclays Center16,302
| 2–2
|- style="background:#fcc;"
| 5
| November 7
| @ Orlando
| 
| Kevin Martin (21)
| Gorgui Dieng (10)
| Mo Williams (7)
| Amway Center16,379
| 2–3
|- style="background:#fcc;"
| 6
| November 8
| @ Miami
| 
| Nikola Peković (19)
| Nikola Peković (11)
| Mo Williams (5)
| American Airlines Arena19,735
| 2–4
|- style="background:#fcc;"
| 7
| November 12
| Houston
| 
| Corey Brewer (18)
| Nikola Peković (13)
| Zach LaVine (9)
| Mexico City Arena18,996
| 2–5
|- style="background:#fcc;"
| 8
| November 14
| @ New Orleans
| 
| Andrew Wiggins (20)
| Gorgui Dieng (9)
| Mo Williams (4)
| Smoothie King Center14,775
| 2–6
|- style="background:#fcc;"
| 9
| November 15
| @ Dallas
| 
| Kevin Martin (34)
| Gorgui Dieng (8)
| Mo Williams (8)
| American Airlines Center19,730
| 2–7
|- style="background:#cfc;"
| 10
| November 19
| New York
| 
| Kevin Martin (37)
| Shabazz Muhammad (8)
| Mo Williams (13)
| Target Center15,304
| 3–7
|- style="background:#fcc;"
| 11
| November 21
| San Antonio
| 
| Anthony Bennett (20)
| Gorgui Dieng (10)
| Williams & Brewer (4)
| Target Center12,414
| 3–8
|- style="background:#fcc;"
| 12
| November 22
| Sacramento
| 
| Andrew Wiggins (29)
| Gorgui Dieng (10)
| Mo Williams (12)
| Target Center13,191
| 3–9
|- style="background:#fcc;"
| 13
| November 26
| Milwaukee
| 
| Corey Brewer (19)
| Wiggins & Dieng (8)
| Wiggins, Young & LaVine (4)
| Target Center14,710
| 3–10
|- style="background:#cfc;"
| 14
| November 28
| @ L.A. Lakers
| 
| Zach LaVine (28)
| Dieng & Brewer (7)
| Mo Williams (11)
| Staples Center18,997
| 4–10
|- style="background:#fcc;"
| 15
| November 30
| @ Portland
| 
| Shabazz Muhammad (28)
| Gorgui Dieng (8)
| Mo Williams (11)
| Moda Center18,843
| 4–11

|- style="background:#fcc;"
| 16
| December 1
| @ L.A. Clippers
| 
| Shabazz Muhammad (18)
| Shabazz Muhammad (10)
| Mo Williams (7)
| Staples Center19,060
| 4–12
|- style="background:#fcc;"
| 17
| December 3
| Philadelphia
| 
| Thaddeus Young (16)
| Gorgui Dieng (16)
| Mo Williams (7)
| Target Center10,463
| 4–13
|- style="background:#fcc;"
| 18
| December 5
| Houston
| 
| Shabazz Muhammad (20)
| Corey Brewer (7)
| Corey Brewer (6)
| Target Center12,101
| 4–14
|- style="background:#fcc;"
| 19
| December 6
| @ San Antonio
| 
| Zach LaVine (22)
| Anthony Bennett (10)
| Zach LaVine (10)
| AT&T Center18,581
| 4–15
|- style="background:#fcc;"
| 20
| December 8
| Golden State
| 
| Andrew Wiggins (21)
| Gorgui Dieng (11)
| Zach LaVine (8)
| Target Center10,296
| 4–16
|- style="background:#cfc;"
| 21
| December 10
| Portland
| 
| Andrew Wiggins (23)
| Jeff Adrien (11)
| Brewer & LaVine (5)
| Target Center10,337
| 5–16
|- style="background:#fcc;"
| 22
| December 12
| Oklahoma City
| 
| Wiggins & Muhammad (18)
| Gorgui Dieng (9)
| Corey Brewer (8)
| Target Center13,557
| 5–17
|- style="background:#fcc;"
| 23
| December 14
| L.A. Lakers
| 
| Shabazz Muhammad (28)
| Dieng & Muhammad (9)
| Corey Brewer (9)
| Target Center15,008
| 5–18
|- style="background:#fcc;"
| 24
| December 16
| @ Washington
| 
| Thaddeus Young (29)
| Gorgui Dieng (12)
| Zach LaVine (8)
| Verizon Center15,823
| 5–19
|- style="background:#fcc;"
| 25
| December 19
| @ Boston
| 
| Shabazz Muhammad (26)
| Bennett & Adrien (7)
| Thaddeus Young (6)
| TD Garden17,042
| 5–20
|- style="background:#fcc;"
| 26
| December 21
| Indiana
| 
| Mo Williams (24)
| Andrew Wiggins (9)
| Mo Williams (10)
| Target Center12,687
| 5–21
|- style="background:#fcc;"
| 27
| December 23
| @ Cleveland
| 
| Andrew Wiggins (27)
| Gorgui Dieng (11)
| Mo Williams (7)
| Quicken Loans Arena20,562
| 5–22
|- style="background:#fcc;"
| 28
| December 26
| @ Denver
| 
| Thaddeus Young (23)
| Gorgui Dieng (13)
| Mo Williams (13)
| Pepsi Center14,516
| 5–23
|- style="background:#fcc;"
| 29
| December 27
| @ Golden State
| 
| Thaddeus Young (17)
| Shabazz Muhammad (9)
| Zach LaVine (14)
| Oracle Arena19,596
| 5–24
|- style="background:#fcc;"
| 30
| December 30
| @ Utah
| 
| Shabazz Muhammad (30)
| Shabazz Muhammad (7)
| Young & Dieng (6)
| EnergySolutions Arena18,947
| 5–25

|- style="background:#fcc;"
| 31
| January 1
| Sacramento
| 
| Andrew Wiggins (27)
| Gorgui Dieng (10)
| Mo Williams (8)
| Target Center13,337
| 5–26
|- style="background:#fcc;"
| 32
| January 3
| Utah
| 
| Wiggins & Williams (20)
| Jeff Adrien (8)
| Mo Williams (3)
| Target Center13,702
| 5–27
|- style="background:#fcc;"
| 33
| January 5
| Denver
| 
| Gorgui Dieng (22)
| Gorgui Dieng (12)
| Mo Williams (7)
| Target Center10,386
| 5–28
|- style="background:#fcc;"
| 34
| January 7
| Phoenix
| 
| Andrew Wiggins (25)
| Anthony Bennett (10)
| Mo Williams (11)
| Target Center10,547
| 5–29
|- style="background:#fcc;"
| 35
| January 9
| @ Milwaukee
| 
| Andrew Wiggins (20)
| Anthony Bennett (8)
| Andrew Wiggins (5)
| BMO Harris Bradley Center15,480
| 5–30
|- style="background:#fcc;"
| 36
| January 10
| San Antonio
| 
| Zach LaVine (19)
| Gorgui Dieng (12)
| Mo Williams (6)
| Target Center17,871
| 5–31
|- style="background:#cfc;"
| 37
| January 13
| @ Indiana
| 
| Mo Williams (52)
| Gorgui Dieng (10)
| Mo Williams (7)
| Bankers Life Fieldhouse16,781
| 6–31
|- style="background:#fcc;"
| 38
| January 16
| @ Phoenix
| 
| Mo Williams (26)
| Thaddeus Young (8)
| Thaddeus Young (6)
| US Airways Center17,441
| 6–32
|- style="background:#cfc;"
| 39
| January 17
| @ Denver
| 
| Andrew Wiggins (31)
| Robbie Hummel (13)
| Mo Williams (7)
| Target Center14,821
| 7–32
|- style="background:#fcc;"
| 40
| January 19
| @ Charlotte
| 
| Thaddeus Young (18)
| Gorgui Dieng (10)
| Mo Williams (4)
| Time Warner Cable Arena17,989
| 7–33
|- style="background:#fcc;"
| 41
| January 21
| Dallas
| 
| Andrew Wiggins (18)
| Thaddeus Young (11)
| Thaddeus Young (6)
| Target Center13,737
| 7–34
|- style="background:#fcc;"
| 42
| January 23
| New Orleans
| 
| Williams & Dieng (7) (15)
| Gorgui Dieng (15)
| Mo Williams (10)
| Target Center14,978
| 7–35
|- style="background:#fcc;"
| 43
| January 25
| @ Atlanta
| 
| Thaddeus Young (26)
| Wiggins, Williams & Dieng (7)
| Thaddeus Young (7)
| Philips Arena18,049
| 7–36
|- style="background:#fcc;"
| 44
| January 26
| @ Oklahoma City
| 
| Andrew Wiggins (23)
| Gorgui Dieng (18)
| Williams & Young (3)
| Chesapeake Energy Arena18,203
| 7–37
|- style="background:#cfc;"
| 45
| January 28
| Boston
| 
| Kevin Martin (21)
| Gorgui Dieng (14)
| Zach LaVine (6)
| Target Center11,434
| 8–37
|- style="background:#fcc;"
| 46
| January 30
| @ Philadelphia
| 
| Kevin Martin (19)
| Gorgui Dieng (10)
| Kevin Martin (5)
| Wells Fargo Center14,333
| 8–38
|- style="background:#fcc;"
| 47
| January 31
| Cleveland
| 
| Andrew Wiggins (33)
| Nikola Peković (12)
| Lorenzo Brown (9)
| Target Center19,562
| 8–39

|- style="background:#fcc;"
| 48
| February 2
| @ Dallas
| 
| Kevin Martin (19)
| Nikola Peković (10)
| Mo Williams (5)
| American Airlines Center19,989
| 8–40
|- style="background:#cfc;"
| 49
| February 4
| Miami
| 
| Kevin Martin (30)
| Gorgui Dieng (9)
| Mo Williams (10)
| Target Center11,517
| 9–40
|- style="background:#cfc;"
| 50
| February 6
| Memphis
| 
| Andrew Wiggins (18)
| Thaddeus Young (8)
| Ricky Rubio (5)
| Target Center14,388
| 10–40
|- style="background:#cfc;"
| 51
| February 8
| @ Detroit
| 
| Nikola Peković (29)
| Kevin Martin (9)
| Mo Williams (9)
| Palace of Auburn Hills16,075
| 11–40
|- style="background:#fcc;"
| 52
| February 9
| Atlanta
| 
| Kevin Martin (21)
| Gorgui Dieng (12)
| Rubio & Young (5)
| Target Center10,987
| 11–41
|- style="background:#fcc;"
| 53
| February 11
| Golden State
| 
| Kevin Martin (21)
| Nikola Peković (13)
| Ricky Rubio (5)
| Target Center14,303
| 11–42
|- align="center"
|colspan="9" bgcolor="#bbcaff"|All-Star Break
|- style="background:#cfc;"
| 54
| February 20
| Phoenix
| 
| Kevin Martin (21)
| Gorgui Dieng (12)
| Ricky Rubio (14)
| Target Center14,077
| 12–42
|- style="background:#fcc;"
| 55
| February 23
| @ Houston
| 
| Andrew Wiggins (30)
| Gorgui Dieng (14)
| Ricky Rubio (7)
| Toyota Center18,240
| 12–43
|- style="background:#cfc;"
| 56
| February 25
| Washington
| 
| Kevin Martin (28)
| Nikola Peković (13)
| Ricky Rubio (8)
| Target Center19,856
| 13–43
|- style="background:#fcc;"
| 57
| February 27
| @ Chicago
| 
| Kevin Martin (18)
| Nikola Peković (11)
| Ricky Rubio (10)
| United Center21,635
| 13–44
|- style="background:#fcc;"
| 58
| February 28
| Memphis
| 
| Andrew Wiggins (25)
| Gorgui Dieng (9)
| Ricky Rubio (10)
| Target Center19,356
| 13–45

|- style="background:#fcc;"
| 59
| March 2
| L.A. Clippers
| 
| Gary Neal (19)
| Ricky Rubio (12)
| Ricky Rubio (11)
| Target Center18,239
| 13–46
|- style="background:#fcc;"
| 60
| March 4
| Denver
| 
| Andrew Wiggins (20)
| Gorgui Dieng (10)
| Ricky Rubio (10)
| Target Center13,848
| 13–47
|- style="background:#cfc;"
| 61
| March 7
| Portland
| 
| Kevin Martin (29)
| Peković & Rubio (8)
| Ricky Rubio (15)
| Target Center19,356
| 14–47
|- style="background:#fcc;"
| 62
| March 9
| @ L.A. Clippers
| 
| Adreian Payne (16)
| Adreian Payne (15)
| Ricky Rubio (12)
| Staples Center19,060
| 14–48
|- style="background:#fcc;"
| 63
| March 11
| @ Phoenix
| 
| Kevin Martin (16)
| Gorgui Dieng (7)
| Ricky Rubio (6)
| US Airways Center17,367
| 14–49
|- style="background:#fcc;"
| 64
| March 13
| @ Oklahoma City
| 
| Gorgui Dieng (21)
| Gorgui Dieng (14)
| Zach LaVine (7)
| Chesapeake Energy Arena18,203
| 14–50
|- style="background:#fcc;"
| 65
| March 15
| @ San Antonio
| 
| Kevin Martin (19)
| Justin Hamilton (10)
| Lorenzo Brown (7)
| AT&T Center18,581
| 14–51
|- style="background:#fcc;"
| 66
| March 16
| Brooklyn
| 
| Kevin Martin (23)
| Justin Hamilton & Wiggins (10)
| Kevin Martin (6)
| Target Center14,234
| 14–52
|- style="background:#fcc;"
| 67
| March 18
| @ Toronto
| 
| Kevin Martin (37)
| Budinger & Rubio (8)
| Ricky Rubio (8)
| Air Canada Centre19,800
| 14–53
|- style="background:#cfc;"
| 68
| March 19
| @ New York
| 
| Kevin Martin (22)
| Gorgui Dieng (11)
| Zach LaVine (4)
| Madison Square Garden19,812
| 15–53
|- style="background:#fcc;"
| 69
| March 22
| Charlotte
| 
| Gorgui Dieng (16)
| Adreian Payne (9)
| Kevin Martin (9)
| Target Center15,262
| 15–54
|- style="background:#cfc;"
| 70
| March 23
| @ Utah
| 
| Zach LaVine (27)
| Adreian Payne (9)
| Lorenzo Brown (6)
| EnergySolutions Arena19,911
| 16–54
|- style="background:#fcc;"
| 71
| March 25
| L.A. Lakers
| 
| Andrew Wiggins (20)
| Lorenzo Brown (9)
| Zach LaVine (5)
| Target Center13,438
| 16–55
|- style="background:#fcc;"
| 72
| March 27
| @ Houston
| 
| Andrew Wiggins (31)
| Gorgui Dieng (12)
| Zach LaVine (8)
| Toyota Center18,322
| 16–56
|- style="background:#fcc;"
| 73
| March 29
| @ New Orleans
| 
| Andrew Wiggins (20)
| Adreian Payne (11)
| Lorenzo Brown (9)
| Smoothie King Center17,576
| 16–57
|- style="background:#fcc;"
| 74
| March 30
| Utah
| 
| Zach LaVine (21)
| Budinger & Hummel (7)
| Brown & LaVine (6)
| Target Center12,229
| 16–58

|- style="background:#fcc;"
| 75
| April 1
| Toronto
| 
| Andrew Wiggins (25)
| Zach LaVine (7)
| Brown & Wiggins (5)
| Target Center12,699
| 16–59
|- style="background:#fcc;"
| 76
| April 3
| Orlando
| 
| Andrew Wiggins (22)
| Justin Hamilton (9)
| Zach LaVine (5)
| Target Center18,334
| 16–60
|- style="background:#fcc;"
| 77
| April 7
| @ Sacramento
| 
| Kevin Martin (37)
| Andrew Wiggins (8)
| Zach LaVine (11)
| Sleep Train Arena16,770
| 16–61
|- style="background:#fcc;"
| 78
| April 8
| @ Portland
| 
| Andrew Wiggins (29)
| Justin Hamilton (9)
| Zach LaVine (6)
| Moda Center19,499
| 16–62
|- style="background:#fcc;"
| 79
| April 10
| @ L.A. Lakers
| 
| Andrew Wiggins (29)
| Andrew Wiggins (10)
| Andrew Wiggins (6)
| Staples Center17,880
| 16–63
|- style="background:#fcc;"
| 80
| April 11
| @ Golden State
| 
| Zach LaVine (37)
| Justin Hamilton (10)
| Andrew Wiggins (9)
| Oracle Arena19,596
| 16–64
|- style="background:#fcc;"
| 81
| April 13
| New Orleans
| 
| Zach LaVine (24)
| Robbie Hummel (10)
| Zach LaVine (7)
| Target Center13,009
| 16–65
|- style="background:#fcc;"
| 82
| April 15
| Oklahoma City
| 
| Kevin Martin (29)
| Anthony Bennett (9)
| Zach LaVine (13)
| Target Center18,250
| 16–66

Player statistics

Summer League

|-
|}

Preseason

|-
|}

Regular season

|
| 22 || 22 || 31.5 || .356 || .255 || .803 || 5.7 || 8.8 || 1.7 || 0 || 10.3
|-
|
| 82 || 82 || 36.2 || .437 || .310 || .760 || 4.6 || 2.1 || 1 || 0.6 || 16.9
|-
|
| 39 || 36 || 33.4 || .427 || .393 || .881 || 3.6 || 2.3 || 0.8 || 0 || 20
|-
|
| 47 || 47 || 20.3 || .467 || .143 || .800 || 6.6 || 1.6 || 1 || 0.4 || 6.9
|-
|
| 73 || 49 || 30 || .506 || .167 || .783 || 8.3 || 2 || 1 || 1.7 || 9.7
|-
|
| 77 || 40 || 24.7 || .422 || .341 || .842 || 2.8 || 3.6 || 0.7 || 0.1 || 10.1
|-
|
| 31 || 29 || 26.3 || .424 || .000 || .837 || 7.5 || 0.9 || 0.6 || 0.4 || 12.5
|-
|
| 38 || 13 || 22.8 || .489 || .392 || .717 || 4.1 || 1.2 || 0.5 || 0.2 || 13.5
|-
|
| 54 || 1 || 22.1 || .374 || .305 || .867 || 2.4 || 1.9 || 0.4 || 0 || 10.1
|-
|
| 67 || 4 || 19.2 || .433 || .364 || .827 || 3 || 1 || 0.7 || 0.1 || 6.8
|-
|
| 29 || 7 || 18.9 || .426 || .214 || .632 || 2.4 || 3.1 || 1 || 0.2 || 4.2
|-
|
| 2 || 0 || 9.5 || .000 || .000 || .000 || 0.5 || 1 || 0 || 0 || 0
|-
|
| 32 || 22 || 23.2 || .414 || .111 || .652 || 5.1 || 0.9 || 0.6 || 0.3 || 6.7
|-
|
| 41 || 14 || 17.4 || .478 || .323 || .830 || 3.3 || 0.9 || 0.7 || 0.7 || 5.3
|-
|
| 57 || 3 || 15.7 || .421 || .304 || .641 || 3.8 || 0.8 || 0.5 || 0.3 || 5.2
|-
|
| 45 || 4 || 16.5 || .459 || .314 || .820 || 3 || 0.6 || 0.4 || 0.2 || 4.4
|-
|}

Injuries

Roster

Transactions

Trades

Free agents

Re-signed

Additions

Subtractions

Awards

Andrew Wiggins won the 2015 NBA Rookie of the Year Award.

References

External links
 2014–15 Minnesota Timberwolves preseason at ESPN
 2014–15 Minnesota Timberwolves regular season at ESPN

Minnesota Timberwolves seasons
Minnesota
2014 in sports in Minnesota
2015 in sports in Minnesota